Ministry of Enlightenment may refer to:

 Reich Ministry of Public Enlightenment and Propaganda (1933–1945), a Nazi government agency to enforce Nazi ideology
 Ministry of Education of the Russian Federation, aka Ministry of Enlightenment of the Russian Federation, established May 2018